The Dermatemydidae are a family of turtles. The family was named by John Edward Gray in 1870, and its only extant genus is Dermatemys.

Subtaxa
†Baptemys
Dermatemys
†Gomphochelys
†Notomorpha

References

Bibliography

 
Turtle families
Taxa named by John Edward Gray
Extant Late Cretaceous first appearances